Adamsville is an unincorporated community in Beaver County, Utah, United States.



Geography
Adamsville is at the west end of Beaver Valley in eastern Beaver County. It lies at the base of the Mineral Mountains, just northeast of Minersville Reservoir along the northern bank of the Beaver River.

History
Adamsville was first settled in the spring of 1862 by David B. Adams and three other families, who established farms along the Beaver River. In 1866, residents were temporarily moved to Greenville for safety during the Black Hawk War, but the settlement continued to grow; in 1867 a townsite was surveyed and the town was named Adamsville. In 1868, a community meetinghouse was built. School was held in the building until around 1920. A post office was established on April 10, 1868. Previous names for the community were Beaver Creek Iron Works and Wales.

See also

References

External links

Unincorporated communities in Beaver County, Utah
Unincorporated communities in Utah
Populated places established in 1862
1862 establishments in Utah Territory